Nižný Žipov  is a village and municipality in the Trebišov District in the Košice Region of south-eastern Slovakia.

History
In historical records the village was first mentioned in 1221.

Geography
The village lies at an altitude of 133 metres and covers an area of 17.071 km².
It has a population of about 1350 people.

Ethnicity
The village is about 96% Slovak and 4% Gypsy.

Facilities
The village has a public library and a football pitch.

External links
https://web.archive.org/web/20100202015957/http://www.statistics.sk/mosmis/eng/run.html

Villages and municipalities in Trebišov District